Ratu Penijamini Veli (1874 – 27 August 1938) was a Fijian chief, civil servant and politician. He served as a member of the Legislative Council from 1937 until his death the following year.

Biography
Born in 1874, Veli joined the civil service in the mid-1890s. He became a sub-inspector of native constabulary in 1906, before being appointed Roko Tui of Macuata Province in 1909. Although he later retired, he was subsequently reappointed to the post.

The Legislative Council was reconstituted prior to the 1937 elections to have five Fijian nominated members, who were chosen by the Governor from a list of ten submitted by the Great Council of Chiefs. Veli was one of the ten nominated, and subsequently one of the five chosen by Governor Arthur Richards. In April 1938 he was awarded a Certificate of Honour by the Governor.

He died in August the following year.

References

1874 births
Fijian chiefs
Fijian civil servants
Members of the Legislative Council of Fiji
1938 deaths